The 2023 South Sydney Rabbitohs season is the 114th in the history of the club. Coached by Jason Demetriou and captained by Cameron Murray, they compete in the National Rugby League's 2023 Telstra Premiership.

Pre-Season

Results 

Source:

See also 

 2023 NRL pre-season results
 2023 NRL season
 2023 NRL season results

References 

South Sydney Rabbitohs seasons
South Sydney Rabbitohs